The Pacific Marine Review was an American monthly magazine dedicated to marine and shipping news that was published from 1904 to 1950. The magazine, which focused on Seattle, Portland, Tacoma, Vancouver, Victoria, San Francisco, and other ports in the North Pacific Ocean, aimed to cover marine affairs impartially, without preference for any particular port.

History 
The Pacific Marine Review was established in Seattle, Washington, on April 1, 1904. The magazine was published by the newly organized Pacific Marine Review Company, which was housed at 1311 Third Avenue in Seattle. At the time of the first publication, regional newspapers, including The Seattle Post-Intelligencer and The Vancouver Province, complimented the Pacific Marine Review for its illustrations, "handsome design," and quality of editing. Over the next nine years, the magazine's paid circulation grew to 1,500. In April 1913, the magazine was sold to James S. Hines, a publisher from San Francisco. 
	
Its new home became 24 California Street. The new publisher lowered the subscription from $3 to $2 and almost doubled the magazine's paid circulation, which reached 2,255 by 1914. By 1930, the magazine's headquarters had moved to 576 Sacramento Street, and its paid circulation reached 3,473. The subscription price remained $2, and advertising rates varied from $100 to $160 per page.

By 1940, Pacific Marine Review paid circulation decreased to 3,050, and the publisher lowered the subscription price to $1.50. By 1950, the subscription price was back at $2, and the magazine's headquarters moved again, this time to 580 Market Street. Paid circulation peaked at 4,083. The December issue of 1950 was the last in the magazine's history.

See also 
 Shipbuilding
 Marine engineering

References

Literature cited

External links 
 Pacific Marine Review at the Internet Archive

1904 establishments in Washington (state)
1950 disestablishments in California
Defunct magazines published in the United States
Magazines established in 1904
Magazines disestablished in 1950
Magazines published in San Francisco
Magazines published in Seattle
Monthly magazines published in the United States
Transport magazines published in the United States